Sundarbans (pronounced ) is a mangrove area in the delta formed by the confluence of the Ganges, Brahmaputra and Meghna Rivers in the Bay of Bengal. Sundarban Reserve Forest (SRF) of Bangladesh is the largest mangrove forest in the world. It spans the area from the Baleswar River in Bangladesh's division of Khulna to the Hooghly River in India's state of West Bengal. It comprises closed and open mangrove forests, land used for agricultural purpose, mudflats and barren land, and is intersected by multiple tidal streams and channels. Sundarbans is home to the world's largest area of mangrove forests. Four protected areas in the Sundarbans are enlisted as UNESCO World Heritage Sites, viz. Sundarbans West (Bangladesh), Sundarbans South (Bangladesh), Sundarbans East (Bangladesh) and Sundarbans National Park (India).

Despite these protections, the Indian Sundarbans were considered endangered in a 2020 assessment under the IUCN Red List of Ecosystems framework. The most abundant tree species are sundri (Heritiera fomes) and gewa (Excoecaria agallocha). The forests provide habitat to 453 fauna wildlife, including 290 bird, 120 fish, 42 mammal, 35 reptile and eight amphibian species. Despite a total ban on all killing or capture of wildlife other than fish and some invertebrates, it appears that there is a consistent pattern of depleted biodiversity or loss of species in the 20th century, and that the ecological quality of the forest is declining.

Despite preservation commitments from both governments, the Sundarbans are under threat from both natural and human-made causes. In 2007, the landfall of Cyclone Sidr damaged around 40% of the Sundarbans. The forest is also suffering from increased salinity due to rising sea levels due to climate change and reduced freshwater supply. In May 2009 Cyclone Aila devastated the Sundarbans with massive casualties. At least 100,000 people were affected by this cyclone. Climate change is expected to continue to negatively affect both natural systems and human populations in the region, resulting in further ecosystem degradation and climate migration. Experts examining the region recommend further focus on mangrove restoration and management and advocating for adaptation of human populations, through processes like managed retreat and investments in resilient infrastructure.

Etymology

The literal meaning of Sundarbans is "beautiful forest". Alternatively, it was proposed that the name is a corruption of Samudraban, Shomudrobôn ("Sea Forest"), or Chandra-bandhe, the name of a tribe. However, the likely origin of the word is Sundari or Sundri, the local name of the mangrove species Heritiera fomes abundant in the area.

History

The history of human settlement in the Sundarbans area can be traced back to Mauryan era (4th-2nd century BCE). A ruin of an abandoned city was found in the Baghmara Forest Block that is attributed to Chand Sadagar, a pre-Mauryan semi-historical figure in Bengali folklore. Archaeological excavation at Kapilmuni, Paikgacha Upazilla, north of the Sundarbans in Bangladesh, revealed ruins of urban settlement dating back to the early middle ages. During the Mughal period, forest tracts were leased out by the local rulers for establishing settlements. In 1757, The British East India Company obtained proprietary rights over Sundarbans from the Mughal Emperor Alamgir II and completed mapping the area in 1764. However, systematic forest management started a century later. The first Forest Management Division to have jurisdiction over the Sundarbans was established in 1869. In 1875 a large portion of the mangrove forests was declared as reserved forests under the Indian Forest Act of 1865 (Act VIII of 1865). The remaining portions of the forests were declared a reserve forest the following year and the forest, which was so far administered by the civil administration district, was placed under the control of the Forest Department. A Forest Division, which is the basic forest management and administration unit, was created in 1879 with the headquarters in Khulna, Bangladesh. The first management plan was written for the period 1893–1898.

Geography

The Sundarban forest lies in the vast delta on the Bay of Bengal formed by the super confluence of the Hooghly, Padma (both are distributaries of Ganges), Brahmaputra and Meghna rivers across southern Bangladesh. The seasonally flooded Sundarbans freshwater swamp forests lie inland from the mangrove forests on the coastal fringe.

The Sundarbans is intersected by a complex network of tidal waterways, mudflats and small islands of salt-tolerant mangrove forests. The interconnected network of waterways makes almost every corner of the forest accessible by boat. The area is known for the Bengal tiger (Panthera tigris), as well as numerous fauna including species of birds, spotted deer, crocodiles and snakes. The fertile soils of the delta have been subject to intensive human use for centuries, and the ecoregion has been mostly converted to intensive agriculture, with few enclaves of forest remaining. The remaining forests, taken together with the Sundarbans mangroves, are important habitat for the endangered tiger. Additionally, the Mangroves species present in the Sundarban area serve a crucial function as a protective barrier for the millions of inhabitants in and around Khulna and Mongla against the floods that result from the cyclones. It also protects from tsunami and soil erosion for the coastal population.

Physiography

The mangrove-dominated Ganges Delta – the Sundarbans – is a complex ecosystem comprising one of the three largest single tracts of mangrove forests of the world. The larger part is situated in Bangladesh, a smaller portion of it lies in India. The Indian part of the forest is estimated to be about 40 percent, while the Bangladeshi part is 60 percent. To the south the forest meets the Bay of Bengal; to the east it is bordered by the Baleswar River and to the north there is a sharp interface with intensively cultivated land. The natural drainage in the upstream areas, other than the main river channels, is everywhere impeded by extensive embankments and polders. Now it has dwindled into about one-third of its original size. Rivers in the Sundarbans are meeting places of salt water and freshwater. Thus, it is a region of transition between the freshwater of the rivers originating from the Ganges and the saline water of the Bay of Bengal.

The Sundarbans along the Bay of Bengal has evolved over the millennia through natural deposition of upstream sediments accompanied by intertidal segregation. The physiography is dominated by deltaic formations that include innumerable drainage lines associated with surface and subaqueous levees, splays and tidal flats. There are also marginal marshes above mean tide level, tidal sandbars and islands with their networks of tidal channels, subaqueous distal bars and proto-delta clays and silt sediments.

Biotic factors here play a significant role in physical coastal evolution, and for wildlife a variety of habitats have developed which include beaches, estuaries, permanent and semi-permanent swamps, tidal flats, tidal creeks, coastal dunes, back dunes and levees. The mangrove vegetation itself assists in the formation of new landmass and the intertidal vegetation plays a significant role in swamp morphology. The activities of mangrove fauna in the intertidal mudflats develop micromorphological features that trap and hold sediments to create a substratum for mangrove seeds. The morphology and evolution of the eolian dunes is controlled by an abundance of xerophytic and halophytic plants. Creepers, grasses and sedges stabilise sand dunes and uncompacted sediments. The Sunderbans mudflats (Banerjee, 1998) are found at the estuary and on the deltaic islands where low velocity of river and tidal current occurs. The flats are exposed in low tides and submerged in high tides, thus being changed morphologically even in one tidal cycle. The tides are so large that approximately one third of the land disappears and reappears every day. The interior parts of the mudflats serve as a perfect home for mangroves.

Ecoregions
Sundarbans features two ecoregions — "Sundarbans freshwater swamp forests" (IM0162) and "Sundarbans mangroves" (IM1406).

Sundarbans freshwater swamp forests
The Sundarbans freshwater swamp forests are a tropical moist broadleaf forest ecoregion of Bangladesh. It represents the brackish swamp forests that lie behind the Sundarbans Mangroves, where the salinity is more pronounced. The freshwater ecoregion is an area where the water is only slightly brackish and becomes quite fresh during the rainy season, when the freshwater plumes from the Ganges and the Brahmaputra rivers push the intruding salt water out and bring a deposit of silt.
The Sundarbans freshwater swamp forests lie between the upland Lower Gangetic plains moist deciduous forests and the brackish-water Sundarbans mangroves bordering the Bay of Bengal.

A victim of large-scale clearing and settlement to support one of the densest human populations in Asia, this ecoregion is under a great threat of extinction. Hundreds of years of habitation and exploitation have exacted a heavy toll on this ecoregion's habitat and biodiversity. There are two protected areas – Narendrapur (110 km2) and Ata Danga Baor (20 km2) that cover a mere 130 km2 of the ecoregion. Habitat loss in this ecoregion is so extensive, and the remaining habitat is so fragmented, that it is difficult to ascertain the composition of the original vegetation of this ecoregion. According to Champion and Seth (1968), the freshwater swamp forests are characterised by Heritiera minor, Xylocarpus molluccensis, Bruguiera conjugata, Sonneratia apetala, Avicennia officinalis, and Sonneratia caseolaris, with Pandanus tectorius, Hibiscus tiliaceus, and Nipa fruticans along the fringing banks.

Sundarbans Mangroves

The dominant mangrove species Heritiera fomes is locally known as sundri or sundari. Mangrove forests are not home to a great variety of plants. They have a thick canopy, and the undergrowth is mostly seedlings of the mangrove trees. Besides the sundari, other tree species in the forest include Avicennia, Xylocarpus mekongensis, Xylocarpus granatum, Sonneratia apetala, Bruguiera gymnorhiza, Ceriops decandra, Aegiceras corniculatum, Rhizophora mucronata, and Nypa fruticans palms.
Twenty-six of the fifty broad mangrove species found in the world grow well in the Sundarbans. The commonly identifiable vegetation types in the dense Sundarbans mangrove forests are salt water mixed forest, mangrove scrub, brackish water mixed forest, littoral forest, wet forest and wet alluvial grass forests. The Bangladesh mangrove vegetation of the Sundarbans differs greatly from other non-deltaic coastal mangrove forests and upland forests associations. Unlike the former, the Rhizophoraceae are of minor importance.

Ecological succession
Ecological succession is generally defined as the successive occupation of a site by different plant communities. In an accreting mudflats the outer community along the sequence represents the pioneer community which is gradually replaced by the next community representing the seral stages and finally by a climax community typical of the climatic zone. Robert Scott Troup suggested that succession began in the newly accreted land created by fresh deposits of eroded soil. The pioneer vegetation on these newly accreted sites is Sonneratia, followed by Avicennia and Nypa. As the ground is elevated as a result of soil deposition, other trees make their appearance. The most prevalent, though one of the late species to appear, is Excoecaria. As the level of land rises through accretion and the land is only occasionally flooded by tides, Heritiera fomes begins to appear.

Flora

A total of 245 genera and 334 plant species were recorded by David Prain in 1903. While most of the mangroves in other parts of the world are characterised by members of the Rhizophoraceae, Avicenneaceae or Combretaceae, the mangroves of Bangladesh are dominated by the Malvaceae and Euphorbiaceae.

The Sundarbans flora is characterised by the abundance of sundari (Heritiera fomes), gewa (Excoecaria agallocha), goran (Ceriops decandra) and keora (Sonneratia apetala) all of which occur prominently throughout the area. The characteristic tree of the forest is the sundari (Heritiera littoralis), from which the name of the forest had probably been derived. It yields a hard wood, used for building houses and making boats, furniture and other things. New forest accretions is often conspicuously dominated by keora (Sonneratia apetala) and tidal forests. It is an indicator species for newly accreted mudbanks and is an important species for wildlife, especially spotted deer (Axis axis). Among palms, Poresia coaractata, Myriostachya wightiana and golpata (Nypa fruticans), and among grasses spear grass (Imperata cylindrica) and khagra (Phragmites karka) are well distributed.

The varieties of the forests that exist in Sundarbans include mangrove scrub, littoral forest, saltwater mixed forest, brackish water mixed forest and swamp forest. Besides the forest, there are extensive areas of brackish water and freshwater marshes, intertidal mudflats, sandflats, sand dunes with typical dune vegetation, open grassland on sandy soils and raised areas supporting a variety of terrestrial shrubs and trees. Since Prain's report there have been considerable changes in the status of various mangrove species and taxonomic revision of the man-grove flora. However, very little exploration of the botanical nature of the Sundarbans has been made to keep up with these changes. Differences in vegetation have been explained in terms of freshwater and low salinity influences in the Northeast and variations in drainage and siltation. The Sundarbans has been classified as a moist tropical forest demonstrating a whole mosaic of seres, comprising primary colonisation on new accretions to more mature beach forests. Historically vegetation types have been recognised in broad correlation with varying degrees of water salinity, freshwater flushing and physiography.

Fauna
The Sundarbans provides a unique ecosystem and a rich wildlife habitat. According to the 2015 tiger census in Bangladesh, and the 2011 tiger census in India, the Sundarbans have about 180 tigers (106 in Bangladesh and 74 in India). Earlier estimates, based on counting unique pugmarks, were much higher. The more recent counts have used camera traps, an improved methodology that yields more accurate results. Tiger attacks were historically common in the area, and are still frequent in the Sundarbans, with around 40 people killed in 2000–2010.

Most importantly, mangroves are a transition from the marine to freshwater and terrestrial systems, and provide critical habitat for numerous species of small fish, crabs, shrimps and other crustaceans that adapt to feed and shelter, and reproduce among the tangled mass of roots, known as pneumatophores, which grow upward from the anaerobic mud to get the supply of oxygen. 
A 1991 study has revealed that the Indian part of the Sundarbans supports diverse biological resources including at least 150 species of commercially important fish, 270 species of birds, 42 species of mammals, 35 reptiles and 8 amphibian species, although new ones are being discovered. This represents a significant proportion of the species present in Bangladesh (i.e. about 30% of the reptiles, 37% the birds and 34% of the mammals) and includes many species which are now extinct elsewhere in the country. Two amphibians, 14 reptiles, 25 aves and five mammals are endangered. The Sundarbans is an important wintering area for migrant water birds and is an area suitable for watching and studying avifauna.

The management of wildlife is restricted to, firstly, the protection of fauna from poaching, and, secondly, designation of some areas as wildlife sanctuaries where no extraction of forest produce is allowed and where the wildlife face few disturbances. Although the fauna of Bangladesh have diminished in recent times and the Sundarbans has not been spared from this decline, the mangrove forest retains several good wildlife habitats and their associated fauna. Of these, the tiger and dolphin are target species for planning wildlife management and tourism development. There are high profile and vulnerable mammals living in two contrasting environments, and their statuses and management are strong indicators of the general condition and management of wildlife. Some species are protected by legislation, notably by the Bangladesh Wildlife (Preservation) Order, 1973 (P.O. 23 of 1973).

Mammals

The Sundarbans are an important habitat for the Bengal tiger (Panthera tigris). The forest also provides habitat for small wild cats such as the jungle cat (Felis chaus), fishing cat (Prionailurus viverrinus), and leopard cat (P. bengalensis).

Several predators dwell in the labyrinth of channels, branches, and roots that poke up into the air. This is the only mangrove ecoregion that harbors the Indo-Pacific region's largest terrestrial predator, the Bengal tiger. Unlike in other habitats, tigers live here and swim among the mangrove islands, where they hunt scarce prey such as the chital deer (Axis axis), Indian muntjacs (Muntiacus muntjak), wild boar (Sus scrofa), and Rhesus macaque (Macaca mulatta). It is estimated that there are now 180 Bengal tigers and about 30,000 spotted deer in the area. The tigers are known to attack and kill humans who venture into the forest, with around 40 deaths recorded in 2000–2010.

Endangered and extinct species

Forest inventories reveal a decline in standing volume of the two main commercial mangrove species – sundari (Heritiera spp.) and gewa (Excoecaria agallocha) — by 40% and 45% respectively between 1959 and 1983. Despite a total ban on all killing or capture of wildlife other than fish and some invertebrates, it appears that there is a consistent pattern of depleted biodiversity or loss of species (notably at least six mammals and one important reptile) in the 20th century, and that the "ecological quality of the original mangrove forest is declining".

The endangered species that live within the Sundarbans and extinct species that used to be include the Bengal tiger, estuarine crocodile, northern river terrapin (Batagur baska), olive ridley sea turtle, Gangetic dolphin, ground turtles, hawksbill sea turtles and king crabs (horse shoe). The Sundarbans hold globally important numbers of the critically endangered masked finfoot and are important wintering sites for the spoon-billed sandpiper and the Indian skimmer. Some species such as hog deer (Axis porcinus), water buffalos (Bubalus bubalis), barasingha or swamp deer (Cervus duvauceli), Javan rhinoceros (Rhinoceros sondaicus), Indian rhinoceros (Rhinoceros unicornis) and the mugger crocodile (Crocodylus palustris) started to become extinct in the Sundarbans towards the middle of the 20th century, because of extensive poaching and hunting by the British and locals. There are other threatened mammal species, such as the capped langur (Semnopithecus pileatus), smooth-coated otter (Lutrogale perspicillata), Asian small-clawed otter (Aonyx cinerea) and large Indian civet (Viverra zibetha).

Climate change impact

The physical development processes along the coast are influenced by a multitude of factors, comprising wave motions, micro and macro-tidal cycles and long shore currents typical to the coastal tract. The shore currents vary greatly along with the monsoon. These are also affected by cyclonic action. Erosion and accretion through these forces maintains varying levels, as yet not properly measured, of physiographic change whilst the mangrove vegetation itself provides a remarkable stability to the entire system. During each monsoon season almost all the Bengal Delta is submerged, much of it for half a year. The sediment of the lower delta plain is primarily advected inland by monsoonal coastal setup and cyclonic events. One of the greatest challenges people living on the Ganges Delta may face in coming years is the threat of rising sea levels caused mostly by subsidence in the region and partly by climate change.

In many of the Bangladesh's mangrove wetlands, freshwater reaching the mangroves was considerably reduced from the 1970s because of diversion of freshwater in the upstream area by neighbouring India through the use of the Farakka Barrage bordering Rajshahi, Bangladesh. Also, the Bengal Basin is slowly tilting towards the east because of neo-tectonic movement, forcing greater freshwater input to the Bangladesh Sundarbans. As a result, the salinity of the Bangladesh Sundarbans is much lower than that of the Indian side. A 1990 study noted that there "is no evidence that environmental degradation in the Himalayas or a 'greenhouse' induced rise in sea level have aggravated floods in Bangladesh"; however, a 2007 report by UNESCO, "Case Studies on Climate Change and World Heritage" has stated that an anthropogenic  rise in sea level (likely by the end of the 21st century, according to the Intergovernmental Panel on Climate Change), combined with other forms of anthropogenic stress on the Sundarbans, could lead to the destruction of 75 percent of the Sundarbans mangroves. Already, Lohachara Island and New Moore Island/South Talpatti Island have disappeared under the sea, and Ghoramara Island is half submerged.

Shrimp cultivation had destroyed another .

Researches from the School of Oceanographic Studies, Jadavpur University, estimated the annual rise in sea level to be  in 2010. It had doubled from  recorded in 2000. This, coupled with an around  rise in surface water temperatures and increased levels of salinity have posed a problem for the survival of the indigenous flora and fauna. The Sundari trees are exceptionally sensitive to salinity and are being threatened with extinction.

Loss of the mangrove forest will result in the loss of the protective biological shield against cyclones and tsunamis. This may put the surrounding coastal communities at high risk. Moreover, the submergence of land mass have rendered up to 6,000 families homeless and around 70,000 people are immediately threatened with the same. This is causing the flight of human capital to the mainland, about 13% in the decade of 2000–2010.

A 2015 ethnographic study, conducted by a team of researchers from Heiderberg university in Germany, found a crisis brewing in the Sunderbans. The study contended that poor planning on the part of the India and Bangladesh governments coupled with natural ecological changes were forcing the flight of human capital from the region

Hazards

Natural hazards
According to a report created by UNESCO, the landfall of Cyclone Sidr damaged around 40% of Sundarbans in 2007.

Human made hazards

In August 2010, a memorandum of understanding was signed between Bangladesh Power Development Board (BPDB) and India's state-owned National Thermal Power Corporation (NTPC) where they designated to implement the coal-fired Rampal power station by 2016. This project violates the environmental impact assessment guidelines for coal-based thermal power plants. Environmental activists contend that the proposed location of the Rampal Station would violate provisions of the Ramsar Convention. The government of Bangladesh rejected the allegations that the coal-based power plant would adversely affect the world's largest mangrove forest.

On 9 December 2014 an oil-tanker named Southern Star VII, carrying  of furnace oil, was sunk in the Sela river of Sundarbans after it had been hit by a cargo vessel. The oil spread over  area after the clash, as of 17 December. The slick spread to a second river and a network of canals in the Sundarbans and blackened the shoreline. The event was very threatening to trees, plankton, vast populations of small fishes and dolphins. The event occurred at a protected Sundarbans mangrove area, home to rare Irrawaddy and Ganges dolphins. Until 15 December 2014 only  of oil from the area were cleaned up by local residents, Bangladesh Navy and the government of Bangladesh. Some reports indicated that the event killed some wildlife. On 13 December 2014, a dead Irrawaddy dolphin was seen floating on the Harintana-Tembulbunia channel of the Sela River.

Economy

The Sundarbans plays an important role in the economy of the southwestern region of Bangladesh as well as in the national economy. It is the single largest source of forest produce in the country. The forest provides raw materials for wood-based industries. In addition to traditional forest produce like timber, fuelwood, pulpwood etc., large-scale harvest of non-wood forest products such as thatching materials, honey, beeswax, fish, crustacean and mollusc resources of the forest takes place regularly. The vegetated tidal lands of the Sundarbans function as an essential habitat, produces nutrients and purifies water. The forest also traps nutrient and sediment, acts as a storm barrier, shore stabiliser and energy storage unit. Last but not the least, the Sunderbans provides an aesthetic attraction for local and foreign tourists. The water houseboat in the Sundarbans is also a recent attraction among the tourists.

The forest has immense protective and productive functions. Constituting 51% of the total reserved forest estate of Bangladesh, it contributes about 41% of total forest revenue and accounts for about 45% of all timber and fuel wood output of the country. A number of industries (e.g., newsprint mill, match factory, hardboard, boat building, furniture making) are based on raw materials obtained from the Sundarbans ecosystem. Non-timber forest products and plantations help generate considerable employment and income opportunities for at least half a million poor coastal people. It provides natural protection to life and properties of the coastal population in cyclone-prone Bangladesh.

Agriculture

Part of the Sundarbans is shielded from tidal inflow by leaves and there one finds villages and agriculture. During the monsoon season, the low lying agricultural lands are waterlogged and the summer crop (kharif crop) is therefore mainly deepwater rice or floating rice. In the dry winter season the land is normally uncropped and used for cattle grazing. However, the lands near the villages are irrigated from ponds that were filled up during monsoon, and vegetable crops (Rabi crops) can be grown here.

Habitation
The Sundarbans has a population of over 4 million but much of it is mostly free of permanent human habitation. Despite human habitations and a century of economic exploitation of the forest well into the late 1940s, the Sundarbans retained a forest closure of about 70% according to the Overseas Development Administration (ODA) of the United Kingdom in 1980.

Administration

The Sundarbans area is one of the most densely populated areas in the world, and the population is increasing. As a result, half of this ecoregion's mangrove forests have been cut down to supply fuelwood and other natural resources. Despite the intense and large-scale exploitation, this still is one of the largest contiguous areas of mangroves in the world. Another threat comes from deforestation and water diversion from the rivers inland, which causes far more silt to be brought to the estuary, clogging up the waterways.

The Directorate of Forest is responsible for the administration and management of Sundarban National Park in West Bengal. The Principal Chief Conservator of Forests (PCCF), Wildlife & Bio-Diversity & ex-officio Chief Wildlife Warden, West Bengal is the senior most executive officer looking over the administration of the park. The Chief Conservator of Forests (South) & Director, Sundarban Biosphere Reserve is the administrative head of the park at the local level and is assisted by a Deputy Field Director and an Assistant Field Director. The park area is divided into two ranges, overseen by range forest officers. Each range is further sub-divided into beats. The park also has floating watch stations and camps to protect the property from poachers.

The park receives financial aid from the State Government as well as the Ministry of Environment and Forests under various Plan and Non-Plan Budgets. Additional funding is received under the Project Tiger from the Central Government. In 2001, a grant of US$20,000 was received as a preparatory assistance for promotion between India and Bangladesh from the World Heritage Fund.

A new Khulna Forest Circle was created in Bangladesh back in 1993 to preserve the forest, and Chief Conservators of Forests have been posted since. The direct administrative head of the Division is the Divisional Forest Officer, based at Khulna, who has a number of professional, subprofessional and support staff and logistic supports for the implementation of necessary management and administrative activities. The basic unit of management is the compartment. There are 55 compartments in four Forest Ranges and these are clearly demarcated mainly by natural features such as rivers, canals and creeks.

Recently West Bengal Cabinet has approved a new district in South 24 Parganas and proposed district was named Sundarban.

Protected areas

The Bangladesh part of the forest lies under two forest divisions, and four administrative ranges viz Chandpai (Khulna District), Sarankhola (Khulna), and Burigoalini (Satkhira District) and has sixteen forest stations. It is further divided into fifty-five compartments and nine blocks. There are three wildlife sanctuaries established in 1977 under the Bangladesh Wildlife (Preservation) Order, 1973 (P.O. 23 of 1973). The West Bengal part of the forest lies under the district of South & North 24 Parganas.

Protected areas cover 15% of the Sundarbans mangroves including Sundarbans National Park and Sajnakhali Wildlife Sanctuary, in West Bengal, Sundarbans East, Sundarbans South and Sundarbans West Wildlife Sanctuaries in Bangladesh.

In May 2019, the local authorities in Bangladesh killed 4 tiger poachers in a shootout in the Sunderbans mangrove area where currently 114 tigers dwell.

Sundarban National Park

The Sundarban National Park is a National Park, Tiger Reserve, and a Biosphere Reserve in West Bengal, India. It is part of the Sundarbans on the Ganges Delta, and adjacent to the Sundarbans Reserve Forest in Bangladesh. The delta is densely covered by mangrove forests, and is one of the largest reserves for the Bengal tiger. It is also home to a variety of bird, reptile and invertebrate species, including the salt-water crocodile. The present Sundarbans National Park was declared as the core area of Sundarbans Tiger Reserve in 1973 and a wildlife sanctuary in 1977. On 4 May 1984 it was declared a National Park.

Sundarbans West Wildlife Sanctuary

Sundarbans West Wildlife Sanctuary is a UNESCO World Heritage Site in Bangladesh. The region supports mangroves, including: sparse stands of Gewa (Excoecaria agallocha) and dense stands of Goran (Ceriops tagal), with discontinuous patches of Hantal palm (Phoenix paludosa) on drier ground, river banks and levees. The fauna of the sanctuary is very diverse with some 40 species of mammals, 260 species of birds and 35 species of reptiles. The greatest of these being the Bengal tiger of which an estimated 350 remain in the Bangladesh Sundarbans. Other large mammals are wild boar, chital horin (spotted deer), Indian otter and macaque monkey. Five species of marine turtles frequent the coastal zone and two endangered reptiles are present – the estuarine crocodile and the Indian python.

Sundarbans East Wildlife Sanctuary

Sundari trees (Heritiera fomes) dominate the flora, interspersed with Gewa (Excoecaria agallocha) and Passur (Xylocarpus mekongensis) with Kankra (Bruguiera gymnorhiza) occurring in areas subject to more frequent flooding. There is an understory of Shingra (Cynometra ramiflora) where, soils are drier and Amur (Aglaia cucullata) in wetter areas and Goran (Ceriops decandra) in more saline places. Nypa palm (Nypa fruticans) is widespread along drainage lines.

Sundarbans South Wildlife Sanctuary

There is evidently the greatest seasonal variation in salinity levels and possibly represents an area of relatively longer duration of moderate salinity where Gewa (Excoecaria agallocha) is the dominant woody species. It is often mixed with Sundri, which is able to displace in circumstances such as artificially opened canopies where Sundri does not regenerate as effectively. It is also frequently associated with a dense understory of Goran (Ceriops tagal) and sometimes Passur.

Sajnakhali Wildlife Sanctuary

Sajnakhali Wildlife Sanctuary is a  area in the northern part of the Sundarbans delta in South 24 Parganas district, West Bengal, India. It is mainly mangrove scrub, forest and swamp. It was set up as a sanctuary in 1976. It is home to a rich population of different species of wildlife, such as water fowl, heron, pelican, spotted deer, rhesus macaques, wild boar, tigers, water monitor lizards, fishing cats, otters, olive ridley turtles, crocodiles, batagur terrapins, and migratory birds.

In popular culture

The Sundarbans is celebrated through numerous Bengali folk songs and dances, often centred around the folk heroes, gods and goddesses specific to the Sunderbans (like Bonbibi and Dakshin Rai) and to the Lower Gangetic Delta (like Manasa and Chand Sadagar). The Bengali folk epic Manasamangal mentions Netidhopani and has some passages set in the Sundarbans during the heroine Behula's quest to bring her husband Lakhindar back to life.

The area provides the setting for several novels by Emilio Salgari, (e.g. The Mystery of the Black Jungle). Sundarbaney Arjan Sardar, a novel by Shibshankar Mitra, and Padma Nadir Majhi, a novel by Manik Bandopadhyay, are based on the rigors of lives of villagers and fishermen living in the Sunderbans region, and are woven into the Bengali psyche to a great extent. Part of the plot of Salman Rushdie's Booker Prize winning novel, Midnight's Children is set in the Sundarbans. This forest is adopted as the setting of Kunal Basu's short story "The Japanese Wife" and the subsequent film adaptation. Most of the plot of an internationally acclaimed novelist, Amitav Ghosh's 2004 novel, The Hungry Tide, is set in the Sundarbans. The plot centres on a headstrong American cetologist who arrives to study a rare species of river dolphin, enlisting a local fisherman and translator to aid her. The book also mentions two accounts of the Bonbibi story of "Dukhey's Redemption". Manik Bandopadhyay's Padma Nadir Majhi was made into a movie by Goutam Ghose.

The Sunderbans has been the subject of a detailed and well-researched scholarly work on Bonbibi (a 'forest goddess' venerated by Hindus), on the relation between the islanders and tigers and on conservation and how it is perceived by the inhabitants of the Sundarbans, as well as numerous non-fiction books, including The Man-Eating Tigers of Sundarbans by Sy Montegomery for a young audience, which was shortlisted for the Dorothy Canfield Fisher Children's Book Award. In Up The Country, Emily Eden discusses her travels through the Sunderbans. Numerous documentary movies have been made about the Sunderbans, including the 2003 IMAX production Shining Bright about the Bengal tiger. The acclaimed BBC TV series Ganges documents the lives of villagers, especially honey collectors, in the Sundarbans.

See also

 Sundarbans Tiger Project
 Indian Council of Forestry Research and Education
 Sangu Wildlife Sanctuary
 Environmental impact of development in the Sundarbans
 Tiger attacks in the Sundarbans

References

Sources

 
 Laskar Muqsudur Rahman, The Sundarbans: A Unique Wilderness of the World ; at USDA Forest Reserve ; McCool, Stephen F.; Cole, David N.; Borrie, William T.; O'Loughlin, Jennifer, comps. 2000. Wilderness science in a time of change conference, Volume 2: Wilderness within the context of larger systems; 1999 May 23–27; Missoula, MT. Proceedings RMRS-P-15-VOL-2. Ogden, UT: US Department of Agriculture, Forest Service, Rocky Mountain Research Station.
 Terminal Report, Integrated Resource Development of the Sundarbans Reserved Forest : Project Findings and Recommendations, Food and Agriculture Organization (acting as executing agency for the United Nations Development Programme), United Nations, Rome, 1998 (prepared for the Government of Bangladesh)
 Blasco, F. (1975). The Mangroves of India. Institut Francis de Pondichéry, Travaux de las Section Scientifique et Technique, Tome XIV, Facicule 1. Pondicherry, India.
 Jalais, Annu. (2005). "Dwelling on Morichjhanpi: When Tigers Became 'Citizens', Refugees 'Tiger-Food'"; Economic and Political Weekly, 23 April 2005, pp. 1757 – 1762.
 Jalais, Annu. (2007). "The Sundarbans: Whose World Heritage Site?", Conservation and Society (vol. 5, no. 4).
 Jalais, Annu. (2008). "Unmasking the Cosmopolitan Tiger", Nature and Culture (vol. 3, no. 1), pp. 25–40.
 Jalais, Annu. (2008). "Bonbibi: Bridging Worlds", Indian Folklore, serial no. 28, Jan 2008.
 Jalais, Annu. (2009). "Confronting Authority, Negotiating Morality: tiger prawn seed collection in the Sundarbans", International Collective in Support of Fishworkers, Yemaya, 32, Nov.  ; Also in French: http://base.d-p-h.info/en/fiches/dph/fiche-dph-8148.html 
 Jalais, Annu. (2010). "Braving Crocodiles with Kali: Being a prawn-seed collector and a modern woman in the 21st century Sundarbans", Socio-Legal Review, Vol. 6.
 Montgomery, Sy (1995). Spell of the Tiger: The Man-Eaters of Sundarbans. Houghton Mifflin Company, New York.
 Rivers of Life: Living with Floods in Bangladesh. M. Q. Zaman. Asian Survey, Vol. 33, No. 10 (October 1993), pp. 985–996
 
 Sundarbans on United Nations Environment Programme
 
 Environmental classification of mangrove wetlands of India . V. Selvam. Current Science, Vol. 84, No. 6, 25 March 2003.

External links

 
 UNESCO World Heritage Centre: The Sundarbans
 UNESCO: Sundarban Biosphere Reserve Information
 World Heritage Site: The Sundarbans
 United Nations Environment Programme World Conservation Monitoring Centre Protected Areas Programme: The Sundarbans
 The Sundarban of Bangladesh: A Rich Biodiversity of the World's Largest Mangrove Ecosystem
 Greenpeace: Sinking Sundarbans – Climate voices
 Tiger Conservation Project in the Bangladeshi Sundarbans
 Research on water management and control in the Sunderbans, West Bengal, India
 Finfishes of Sundarbans
 Nasa images: set 01 and set 2

 
Geography of South 24 Parganas district
Bay of Bengal
Protected areas of Bangladesh
Protected areas of West Bengal
Indomalayan ecoregions
Mangrove ecoregions
Tropical and subtropical moist broadleaf forests
Ecoregions of Bangladesh
Ecoregions of India
Natural regions of Asia
Environment of West Bengal
Forests of Bangladesh
Forests of India
Forests of West Bengal
Ramsar sites in Bangladesh
Wetlands of India
Ramsar sites in India
Tourist attractions in Bangladesh
Tourist attractions in West Bengal
World Heritage Sites in Bangladesh
World Heritage Sites in India
Regions of West Bengal
Regions of India